Progress MS-08, identified by NASA as Progress 69P, was a Progress spaceflight, operated by Roscosmos to resupply the International Space Station (ISS).

History 
The Progress-MS is an uncrewed freighter based on the Progress-M featuring improved avionics. This improved variant first launched on 21 December 2015. It has the following improvements:

 New external compartment that enables it to deploy satellites. Each compartment can hold up to four launch containers. First time installed on Progress MS-03.
 Enhanced redundancy thanks to the addition of a backup system of electrical motors for the docking and sealing mechanism.
 Improved Micrometeoroid (MMOD) protection with additional panels in the cargo compartment.
 Luch Russian relay satellites link capabilities enable telemetry and control even when not in direct view of ground radio stations.
 GNSS autonomous navigation enables real time determination of the status vector and orbital parameters dispensing with the need of ground station orbit determination.
 Real time relative navigation thanks to direct radio data exchange capabilities with the space station.
 New digital radio that enables enhanced TV camera view for the docking operations.
 The Ukrainian Chezara Kvant-V on board radio system and antenna/feeder system has been replaced with a Unified Command Telemetry System (UCTS).
 Replacement of the Kurs A with Kurs NA digital system.

Launch 
Progress MS-08 launched on 13 February 2018 from the Baikonur Cosmodrome in Kazakhstan atop a Soyuz-2.1a rocket, at 08:13:33 UTC.

Docking
Progress MS-08 docked on 15 February 2018 with the aft docking port of the Zvezda module, at 10:38 UTC.

Cargo 
The Progress MS-08 spacecraft delivered 2,494 kg of cargo and supplies to the International Space Station.
The following is a breakdown of cargo bound for the ISS:

 Dry cargo: 1,390 kg
 Fuel: 890 kg
 Oxygen and Air: 46 kg
 Water: 430 kg

Progress MS-08 also includes two nanosatellites: Tanyusha YuZGU-3 (1998-067PJ) and Tanyusha YuZGU-4 (1998-067PK) (a.k.a. Radioskaf RS-8 and Radioskaf RS-9) with a mass of 2.5 kg, which was developed jointly by RKK Energia and students at the South-Western State University, YuZGU, in the city of Kursk. The satellites will be launched by spacewalking cosmonauts.

Undocking and decay 
Undocking on 23 August 2018, at 02:16 UTC. And decay in the atmosphere and its debris entered the Pacific Ocean, on 30 August 2018.

References 

Progress (spacecraft) missions
Spacecraft launched in 2018
2018 in Russia
Supply vehicles for the International Space Station
Spacecraft launched by Soyuz-2 rockets
Spacecraft which reentered in 2018